Darband is a village in Cheshmeh Langan Rural District, in the Central District of Fereydunshahr County, Isfahan Province, Iran. At the 2006 census, its population was 33, in 6 families.

References 

Populated places in Fereydunshahr County